The men's 1500 metres event at the 1969 European Indoor Games was held on 9 March in Belgrade.

Medalists

Results

Heats
First 3 from each heat (Q) and the next 2 fastest qualified for the final.

Final

References

1500 metres at the European Athletics Indoor Championships
1500